Finisterre is an outdoor apparel company with a focus on functional and sustainable products. Based in St Agnes, Cornwall, and founded by Tom Kay in 2003 they are recognised as a cold water surf company.

History 
In 2003, Tom Kay founded Finisterre above a surf shop after noticing problems with the ethics, design and functionality of many action sports brands. It started with a fleece and quickly grew to include a range of clothing for surfers to wear before and after surfing.

Products 
Finisterre produces a range of technical clothing including merino underwear and base layers, waterproof and insulated jackets, sweatshirts, hoodies along with clothing for running and yoga. In all lines of Finisterre's clothing range, performance and sustainability are key factors. The products have been well reviewed by a number of sources for both their performance and green credentials.  Exclusive fabrics such as "C-shell" used in the "Anabatic Jacket" have been developed using recycled polyester and is fully recyclable at the end of the jackets lifespan. Recycled polyester is also used to make the fill in the range of insulated jackets as well as fleeces. The range of sweatshirts and Tshirts are all produced from Organic Cotton that is grown in Eastern Europe and spun in Portugal. Finisterre produce a range of merino wool layers including long johns, underwear, vests, and short and long sleeve t-shirts. The merino wool is sourced from Australia with full traceability reports to ensure none of the sheep subjected to the practice of mulesing. Although this is not organic wool with the traceability programme ensures better welfare for the sheep producing the wool. One of the biggest developments in the Finisterre's wool range is the Bowmont Project.  Finisterre have also introduced an initiative called i-spy which is clear traceability resource for all their products and materials.

In 2015, the production of many garments was controversially moved to China. Despite Human Rights abuses and other ethical concerns, Finisterre defended the move on the grounds of overall carbon footprint and the need of a small business to grow.

In 2019, Finisterre announced to use garment bags made from Aquapak polymer for the spring 2020 collection.

Projects

Bowmont Wool 

The Bowmont sheep  is an extremely rare breed that was bred in the 1980s to create a new high quality fibre, by crossing a Saxon Merino with a Shetland. This project was undertaken by the Macaulay Institute in order to create a breed of sheep intended as a UK rival to the fine wool of the merino sheep in New Zealand and Australia. In 2006 due to lack of funding the Macaulay Institute closed their research farm after 25 years just when the sheep were becoming consistent and the breed stabilising. At this time there wasn’t a large enough market for the fine wool so many of the sheep got either slaughtered or cross bred, creating a less luxurious fibre. Finisterre have teamed up with Lesley Prior at Devon Fine Fibres, the only keeper of purebred Bowmont sheep, to rescue the breed from the brink of extinction, create a sustainable market for the wool and aid in the breed’s development and keeping them alive. With the help of clever promotional material and viral videos  the project is getting a lot of attention from the likes of Prince Charles and Savile Row  with a large interest in the sustainability of producing high quality, fine wool in the UK. The Bowmont will be the finest wool sheep in Europe; only being challenged by the merino in further afield parts of the world.

I-spy - Traceability Programme 
The i-spy initiative is a tool on Finisterre's website that is a clear and concise source of information showing the traceability of the Finisterre products. It shows the full cycle of the Finisterre products from design through to reaching the customer. Within the cycle it enables the viewer to get detailed information about exactly what materials are used and where they are sourced, where and how the materials are processed, the location of the manufacturing and how the materials and products are transported between each of these steps.

Ambassadors 
Finisterre supports a number of athletes and adventurers in a range of pursuits. Known as ambassadors  for the brand these people include

Athletes
 Matt Smith (Captain)
 Noah Lane
 Fergal Smith
 Easkey Britton
 Sandy Kerr
 Sam Bleakley
Photographers
 David Gray
 James Bowden
 Ian Mitchinson
 Jack Johns
 Chris McClean
 Lewis Arnold
 Mickey Smith
 Al Mackinnon
 Abbi Hughes

Finisterre also supported former Rugby player Josh Lewsey on his attempt to climb Mount Everest. Sadly Josh did not reach the summit due to a failure within his oxygen equipment and was forced to descend in a matter of life and death urgency.

Awards
During the company's history it has received a range of awards. Their awards include the RSPCA good business Award 2010, Observer Ethical Business Award 2008  and the Surfer’s Path Green Wave Award 2008.

Finisterre became a certified B Corporation in January 2018.

References 

31.You tube film about Tom Kay 2014.

Companies based in Cornwall
Clothing retailers of England
Clothing companies of England
B Lab-certified corporations
Outdoor clothing brands